Julia Karbovskaya (born 15 January 1986) is a Russian former pair skater. With former partner Sergei Slavnov, she is the 2002 World Junior silver medalist. They were coached by Nikolai Velikov at the Yubileyny rink in Saint Petersburg. Their partnership ended in 2003.

Programs 
(with Slavnov)

Results 
(with Slavnov)

References

External links 
 
 Julia Karbovskaya / Sergei Slavnov at Tracings

Russian female pair skaters
1986 births
Figure skaters from Saint Petersburg
Living people
World Junior Figure Skating Championships medalists